Panamaram is a village in Wayanad district in the state of Kerala, India.

Demographics

 India census, Panamaram had a population of 11651 with 5891 males and 5760 females.

Panamaram River

Panamaram River is a tributary of the Kabani River along with Mananthavady, Bavali, Noolpuzha and Nugu Rivers. Kabani and its tributaries play a key role in the enhancement of the landscapes of Wayanad District.

About 6 km north of Panamaram, the Kabini takes birth. It is the confluence of the Panamaram river, originating in the Western Ghats near Pookode Lake, a perennial lake near Lakkidi, 4,500 ft above sea level, and the Mananthavady river, springing from the 5,000 ft Tondarmudi. The Kabini is, perhaps, the most feminine of Kerala rivers. The flow of life on its banks is incredibly peaceful and dream-like. The confluence of these rivers is Kabani River and it after entering the state of Karnataka merges with the Kaveri River.

Panamaram Fort

Panamaram has great significance in the history of Indian freedom struggle as it witnessed one of the first freedom struggle in South India.
On 11 October 1802 Pazhassi Raja's followers like Thalakkal Chanthu and Edachena Kunkan Nair captured the Panamaram Fort which was manned by the infantry units of Bombay. Commanding officer Capt. Dickinson and Lt. Maxwell were killed in action along with 25 soldiers. And this victory brought a new vigor to the resistance movement.

Panamaram Heronry

According to the annual heronry count of the Malabar Natural History Society (MNHS), the Panamaram Heronry is the largest heronry in Malabar in terms of number and diversity of birds breeding there. It is a small (1 acre) island in the river Kabani, an elevated sand bank. Government has issued orders to take apt measures to conserve the Panamaram Heronry. The massive destruction of bamboo groves on the heronry and unbridled sand mining are the two vital issues the heronry is facing. It has been observed that, many birds of the foreign origin also migrate to Panamaram during the nestling season. The cattle egret (Bubulcus ibis) was also observed breeding here in 2010, the breeding of the bird is reported in the state after 62 years. Other main species are little egret, Ardeola (pond heron), night heron, intermediate egret, purple heron, and black-headed ibis.

Transportation
Panamaram town comes in the exact middle of Wayanad district. It can be accessed from Mananthavady, Sulthan Bathery or Kalpetta. The Periya ghat road connects Mananthavady to Kannur and Thalassery.  The Thamarassery mountain road connects Calicut with Kalpetta. The Bangalore-Mysore Road connects through Gundlupet, Sulthan Bathery through Nadavayal Road to Panamaram from one side and Mysore- Handpost [HD Kotte] , Bavali, Mananthavady to Panamaram from the other side.  The Kuttiady mountain road connects Vatakara with Kalpetta and Mananthavady. The Palchuram mountain road connects Kannur and Iritty with Mananthavady.  The road from Nilambur to Ooty is also connected to Wayanad through the village of Meppadi.

The nearby railway stations are: Kozhikode (90kms); Kannur (105kms); Mysore (120kms);
The nearby airports are: Kannur International Airport 80 kms; Kozhikode International Airport-105 kms; Mysore Airport-120 kms; Coimbatore International Airport-210 kms; and Bengaluru International Airport-330 kms.

See also 
 Mananthavady 
 Nadavayal 
 Thondernad
 Vellamunda
 Nalloornad
Payyampally
Thavinjal
Vimalanager
Anjukunnu
Tharuvana
Kallody
Oorpally
Valat
Thrissilery
Kayakkunn

References

Villages in Wayanad district
Panamaram area
Cities and towns in Wayanad district